The Fuji Cabin is a three-wheeled microcar produced by Fuji Toshuda Motors of Tokyo, Japan, from 1957 until 1958. It was introduced at the Tokyo Motor Show in 1955. The car has two front wheels and one rear. Its two-seater body, with a distinctive single headlamp, is constructed of fibreglass.

Despite being one of the most successful cars of its type in Japan's post-Second World War automobile market, only 85 units were built, partly because of the relatively poor quality of its fibreglass body and partly because of its relatively high price.

References

Citations

Bibliography

Three-wheeled motor vehicles
Cars introduced in 1955